Pax Labs (formerly Ploom and stylized as PAX Labs) is an American electronic vaporizer company founded in 2007 that markets the Pax vaporizers. The company developed the Juul (pronounced jewel) e-cigarette; Juul Labs was spun out as a separate company in 2017.

History 

The company was founded by James Monsees and Adam Bowen in 2007 under the name Ploom. , it has distribution in the United States and Canada and has received $46.7 million in "series C" funding from various sources. In August 2016, Tyler Goldman became the CEO of Pax. Monsees left Pax in July 2017. Bowen left Pax in June 2017. Goldman left Pax in 2017. Bharat Vasan served as CEO from February 2018 until September 2019.

The company has been involved with Japan Tobacco International. It markets the Pax vaporizers, starting with the Pax by Ploom. As Pax Labs, Inc., the company then introduced the Pax 2 and can be used with loose-leaf tobacco or cannabis. In November 2016, the Pax 3 was released, featuring compatibility with both extracts and plant matter, new tools and accessories, and a complementary smart phone app. The same month, Pax also introduced an extract-based vaporizer called the Era, which operates by heating a concentrated cannabis liquid held in very small containers.

Pax closed a $420 million equity round in April 2019, which valued the company at $1.7 billion. In June 2019, Pax announced it had signed agreements with four Canadian pot stocks to supply it with cannabis extracts, resins, and distillates for its PAX Era pen-and-pod vape system. Those four companies were Aurora Cannabis, Aphria, OrganiGram Holdings and The Supreme Cannabis Company.

Juul 

On June 1, 2015, the company introduced Juul, a type of e-cigarette that utilizes nicotine salts that exist in leaf-based tobacco, for its key ingredient. They were given a US patent for their nicotine salt preparation in 2015. The nicotine salts are said to create an experience more like smoking than other e-cigarettes on the market. The e-cigarette is shaped like a USB flash drive and recharges using a magnetic USB deck. Each cartridge (called a Juul pod) contains about the same amount of nicotine as one pack of cigarettes and delivers approximately 200 hits. Juul attempts to deliver a nicotine peak in five minutes, similar to a traditional cigarette. Mango was among the five most popular flavors, but it is no longer available in the United States where now only menthol and tobacco flavors are sold. A Juul starter kit sells for about $49.99. Given the high nicotine concentrations in Juul, the nicotine-related health consequences of its use by young people could be more severe than those from their use of other e-cigarette products.

In 2017 Juul Labs was spun out of Pax Labs as an independent company. Tyler Goldman, former CEO of Pax Labs, was named CEO of Juul after the spin-off.

PAX Vaporizer

PAX 1 
Originally released in 2012, the PAX 1 was the first of the dry herb vaporizers to be sold by Ploom before the company became known as PAX Labs.

PAX 2 
The second PAX vaporizer was released on March 10, 2015. This model of the PAX line featured a smaller design than the original device.

PAX 3 
In November of 2016, the third PAX device was released. This was the first model to allow the use of both dry herbs and cannabis concentrates, and features wireless connectivity to smartphones via the PAX application.

PAX Era 
Released alongside the PAX 3 in late 2016, the PAX Era was the first cannabis vaporizer to use proprietary PAX Pod cartridges. Similar in design to PAX Labs' previous device, the Juul, the PAX Era uses food-grade polycarbonate cartridges which are filled with pure cannabis oil. Like the PAX 3 vaporizer, the PAX Era may be wirelessly connected to smartphones via the PAX application.

References

External links 
 

Electronic cigarette manufacturers
Tobacco companies of the United States
American companies established in 2007
Manufacturing companies established in 2007
2007 establishments in California
Manufacturing companies based in San Francisco